The American Supply Company Building is a historic industrial building at 1364 Broad Street in Central Falls, Rhode Island.  Built in 1876, it was home to a prominent regional manufacturer of loom parts supplied to the area's textile manufacturers.  The building was listed on the National Register of Historic Places in 2017.  As of 2017, it is vacant and owned by the city, which is considering adaptive reuse for the property.

Description and history
The American Supply Company Building is located in northern Central Falls, on the west side of Broad Street on the south bank of the Blackstone River.  It is across the street from the historic Valley Falls Mill.  It is a 2-1/2 story wood frame structure, finished in vinyl siding laid over original wooden clapboards.  It is covered by a gabled roof with continuous shed-roof dormers.  Its western elevation consists of protective plywood, due to the c. 2000 demolition of a large ell.  The interior of the building is basically intact, although there is no longer any manufacturing equipment in it.  It does retain elements of a late 19th-century freight elevator powered by water or steam.

The American Supply Company was founded in 1883 by the merger of three businesses involved in the manufacture of parts for large textile weaving looms.  Myron Fish founded one of these companies in Worcester, Massachusetts in the 1860s, and was lured to Central Falls by the offer of manufacturing space in the Valley Falls complex.  In 1876, Fish contracted with the Valley Falls Company to lease space across Broad Street for the construction of a dedicated manufacturing space.  Fish specialized in manufacturing belts, but also made other parts.  He merged in 1883 with John Kendrick, a manufacturer of similar specialty parts for looms, who was based in Providence.  The new company was called the American Supply Company.  In 1890 it greatly expanded the facility on Broad Street, building an ell that dwarfed the size of the original building; this was demolished about 2000, along with a boiler house and shed that also stood on the property.

The American Supply Company was harmed by New England's decline as a textile center, and closed in 1961.  The building was used from 1963 to 1991 by a rug manufacturer, and has been owned by the city or state for most of the time since 1995.  As of 2017, the city owns the property and is considering adaptive uses suitable for its riverfront location.

See also
National Register of Historic Places listings in Providence County, Rhode Island

References

Buildings and structures in Central Falls, Rhode Island
Industrial buildings and structures on the National Register of Historic Places in Rhode Island
National Register of Historic Places in Providence County, Rhode Island